Frederick Reginald Morris (born 1 December 1929) is a retired Irish judge who served as President of the High Court from 1998 to 2001 and a Judge of the High Court from 1990 to 2001.

Born in Kilkenny in 1929, he was called to the bar in 1959 and became a senior counsel in 1973. He was made a High Court judge in 1990 and appointed to the Special Criminal Court the following year. He was President of the High Court from 1998 to 2001, and therefore an ex-officio member of the Supreme Court of Ireland. He was the Chairperson of the Referendum Commission in 2002 for the 25th Amendment Bill 2002.

From 2002 to 2008, he was the chairman and Sole Member of the Morris Tribunal, which investigated allegations of corrupt and dishonest policing in County Donegal.

References

Presidents of the High Court (Ireland)
Irish barristers
People from County Kilkenny
Living people
21st-century Irish judges
20th-century Irish lawyers
20th-century Irish judges
Chairpersons of the Referendum Commission
Alumni of King's Inns
1929 births